Bapara may refer to:

 Bapara, Mauritania, an Ancient city and former bishopric, now a Latin Catholic titular see
 Bapara (genus), a genus of moths